Annie Somers Gilchrist (1841 – February 2, 1912) was a pioneer woman author of Tennessee during the long nineteenth century who wrote novels, poetry, and biographies. As a novelist, she was best known by the popular novels: Rosehurst, Harcourt, and The Mystery of Beechcroft. Her poems were numerous. She was also an excellent musician and elocutionist.

Early life and education
Annie Somers was born at "The Oaks", her father's plantation near Dresden, Tennessee, 1841. Her father, James Somers, served in the War of 1812. In 1820, he married Ann McFarland of Wilson County, Tennessee, and removing to Weakley County, Tennessee, he amassed a large fortune, the major part of which he lost during the civil war. She had several older siblings including Jacob, John, James, Jane, Lafayette, and Earskin. John went on to serve as chancellor of the Tenth Division Chancery Court.

She was a Daughters of the American Revolution (D. A. R.) by right of her descent from Captain Matthew Somers, nephew of Sir George Somers, the traveler and soldier for whom Somers Islands (now called Bermuda) were named. On her maternal side, Gilchrist was a descendant of Mary Arden's brother; Mary Arden was the mother of William Shakespeare. Gilchrist's grandfather, John Somers, a descendant of Captain Matthew, was born in Warwickshire, England, and, marrying there Catherine Arden (cousin to William Shakespeare), emigrated to the Thirteen Colonies, and held a captain's commission in the Revolutionary War.

Gilchrist was educated at the Mary Sharp College, Winchester, Tennessee, receiving instruction in writing from Adelia C. Graves.

Career

She began writing after marriage, becoming a regular contributor to Godey's Lady's Book. Her first story, "The Mystery of Beechcroft", appeared as a serial in that magazine. As a novelist, she was best known by the popular novels: Rosehurst, Harcourt, and The Mystery of Beechcroft.

"The Indian's Prophecy", "Put None but Americans on Guard To-night" (which was recited by her at the inaugural of the Tennessee Centennial), "Ethel", "To Annie", and "Our Glorious Banner, the Hope of the Free", were favorably known. "The Indian's Prophecy" and "Put None but Americans on Guard To-night" were read by every D. A. R. chapter in the U.S. as they were published in the association's organ, the American Monthly Magazine. "The Blue Tennessee", "The Great Secret", "Visions", and "Night Thoughts" appeared in Godey's, 1877; "Night Thoughts" was inscribed to Mrs. Hallie Simpson, of Memphis, Tennessee.

In addition to the D. A. R., she was a member of the United Daughters of the Confederacy, and the Nashville Woman's Press and Authors Club. In 1906, she was elected Recording Secretary of the local branch of the Woman's Christian Temperance Union.

Personal life
In Weakley, September 4, 1860, she married John Alexander Gilchrist (1836-1891), a native of New York, and who was of the well-known Gilchrist family. He was a businessman in her native county of Weakley. She resided with her husband in the North during the civil war, 1861-65, but following the close of the war, returned to Nashville where her husband conducted a hotel. They had at least one child, a son, Oscar. By 1897, she was widowed by some years. 

In religion, she was a member of the First Baptist Church, Nashville.

Annie Somers Gilchrist died at her home in Nashville, February 2, 1912. Interment was in Dresden.

Selected works

Compilations

 Some Representative Women of Tennessee, 1902 (biographies) (Text)
 A souvenir of the Tennessee centennial; poems, 1897 (biographies; poems) (Text)

Novels
 The Mystery of Beechcroft, 1877
 Rosehurst, or, The step-daughter, 1884
 Harcourt, or, A soul illumined, 1886
 The robins' talk of Tennessee, 1901
 Katherine Somerville, or, the Southland before and after the civil war, 1906 (Text)
 The night-rider's daughter, 1910 (Text)
 Zulieme

Poems
 "The Indian's Prophecy"
 "Put None but Americans on Guard To-night"
 "Ethel"
 "To Annie"
 "Our Glorious Banner, the Hope of the Free"
 "The Indian's Prophecy"
 "Put None but Americans on Guard To-night"
 "The Blue Tennessee"
 "The Great Secret"
 "Visions"
 "Night Thoughts"

Notes

References

External links
 Review of The night-rider's daughter at The Tennessean (Nashville, Tennessee), 20 November 1910, p. 34

1841 births
1912 deaths
19th-century American biographers
20th-century American biographers
19th-century American poets
20th-century American poets
19th-century American novelists
20th-century American novelists
19th-century American women writers
People from Dresden, Tennessee
Writers from Tennessee
Poets from Tennessee
American women biographers
American women novelists
American women poets
Daughters of the American Revolution people
Woman's Christian Temperance Union people